In 2013, Jylland RLFC was the first rugby league club founded in Jutland and the second after the Copenhagen RLFC was founded in Denmark.

Rugby league was introduced in Denmark in 2008, which led to the Denmark National Rugby League Team playing in international competitions.

Initially, Copenhagen's only competition was against Swedish teams, but the formation of a team in Jutland led to the first game to be played in June 2013 in Randers, Jutland.

References

External links

Rugby league teams
Rugby league in Denmark
Sports clubs in Denmark
Rugby clubs established in 2013